Krystian Zdrojkowski (born 20 December 1982) is a Polish short track speed skater. He competed in three events at the 2002 Winter Olympics.

References

1982 births
Living people
Polish male short track speed skaters
Olympic short track speed skaters of Poland
Short track speed skaters at the 2002 Winter Olympics
Sportspeople from Białystok